"Booty Dew" is a song by Texas rap group GS Boyz. It was first sampled in their previous single, "Stanky Legg".

Commercial performance 
"Booty Dew" debuted at number 82 on the Hot R&B/Hip-Hop Songs chart, later peaking at number 62 in its fifth week. The song stayed on the charts for 12 weeks before falling off. It is the last single from GS Boyz that charted.

Music video
The GS Boyz appeared on BET's 106 & Park to premiere the video of "Booty Dew". It features them performing at a party.

Charts

External links
 "Booty Dew" music Video at MTV

References 

2008 songs
2009 singles
GS Boyz songs
J Records singles